Periya Tiruvantati is a compilation of hymns written by Nammalvar, one of the Alvars, the poet-saints of the Tamil Vaishnava tradition. This work, which is a part of the Naalayira Divya Prabandham, consists of eighty-seven hymns referred to as pasurams, dedicated to the praise of the Hindu preserver deity, Vishnu. It is often regarded to contain the essence of the Atharva Veda.

Hymns 

The hymns of the Periya Tiruvantati are written in the poetic style called the antati, in which a new verse is linked with the last word of the preceding verse.

There are two theories that seek to explain the name of this text, both of which are drawn from hymns within the work. In the fifty-sixth hymn of the Periya Tiruvantati, Nammalvar asserts his belief that the performance of prapatti alone is enough to receive the protection of the deity Krishna.This is interpreted to be the essence of the charama shlokam, an ontological hymn, which is regarded to be of such significance that the antati was henceforth deemed to be great. In the seventy-fifth hymn of this work, Nammalvar engages in a theological conversation with Vishnu, where he acknowledges his attributes. As a metaphor of devotion, he states that he had deftly captured the deity in his heart, a deity who had captured the entire world. Thus, he rhetorically wonders who among the two of them was greater, lending this question to the name of the text.

The forty-ninth hymn of the Periya Tiruvantati describes Nammalvar's perception of Krishna:

See also 

 Tiruviruttam
 Tiruvasiriyam
 Nachiyar Tirumoli

References 

Naalayira Divya Prabandham
Vaishnava texts
Tamil Hindu literature

External links 
Periya Tiruvantati text (Tamil).pdf